Kenn Smith (born April 27, 1962), birth name Kenneth LaMont Smith, is an American guitarist, bassist, composer, educator and journalist, born in Chicago, Illinois. Well versed in many styles of music, Ambient, Jazz, Classical, Rock, Progressive Rock.

Early years

As a child of the 60s and 70s, living on the West Side of Chicago, his ears laid full of the sounds of Motown, Soul, Funk, Country, Jazz and Rock. From television shows such as Hee Haw, (where he discovered his first guitar Idol Roy Clark) to Midnight Special. Where both mother and father listen to Jazz, Blues, Soul, and R&B records daily, as well as a neighborhood filled
with amateur and professional musicians. It was a great time to be a young aspiring guitarist.

When the family moved to the south-side of Chicago in 1975, Smith began his guitar studies at age 13 with a visit to the local music store purchasing two Mel Bay books. In 1978, the family moved to the western suburbs of Chicago Maywood, Illinois. At the age of 16 he began classical guitar studies with guitarist Bruce Walters, and later continue studies at Jack Cecchini Studio in Chicago till 1982.

While attending Proviso East High School, he played electric and classical guitar as well as timpani in the Proviso Township Orchestra, electric guitar and bass in the Proviso East High School jazz band, where he received the Louis Armstrong Award for Outstanding Jazz Improvisation during his senior year.

Career

In 1982, Kenn began his career teaching guitar at Robinson's Music Academy in his home town of Maywood, Illinois, as well as performing with local funk and fusion bands in town and the Chicago area. All while attending Columbia College of Chicago, studying music management and production. In 1987 he attend the American Conservatory of Music where he studied jazz guitar and composition. In between those years of teaching, performing and study, he became an avid fan of progressive rock and fusion, developing skills as a guitarist, bassist and composer.

In 1986, he began his career as a freelance guitarist and bassist, performing on Chicago's jazz, blues and rock scene. But it wasn't till 1989 his professional career took off, working as a guitarist at the Chicago Cotton Club. Sharing the stage with many future greats such as Bernie Mac, R. Kelly and many others who got their start there. It was also where he later formed his first jazz trio and open for jazz greats Shirley Horn, Stanley Turrentine, Freddie Cole (brother of Nat King Cole), Art Porter. As a jazz side man he played with other jazz greats, Jodie Christian, Guy Fricano, Johnny Frigo, Bobby Broom, Najee and many others. In 1992, he was asked to tour as a guitarist with the famed R&B group the Chi-Lites, and did so until 1994. He then went on doing tours and session work with many great performers in all styles of music as both a guitarist and bassist.

As a recording artist for his own label Kenn Smith Music, he has written, produced and recorded eight (8) albums. (1997) BLUE, (2002) TWO, (2006) Short Stories, (2011) Samples, (2012) If I Remember, (2014) Vintage Me, (2016) Themes and a classical music release (2017) Classic Me, all are available at CD Baby, iTunes, Amazon and other online music sites.

Today he is respected as one of the most diverse guitarist and bassist, admired by many for his eclectic versatility as a musician/composer in all styles, most notably jazz, classical, ambient music.

As an author and journalist he has written an instruction book for electric bass and numerous articles for online magazines such as Mel Bay Bass Sessions, Bass Musician Magazine and other online publications.

Discography

Solo albums
 BLUE (1997)
 TWO (2002)
 Short Stories (2006)
 Samples (2010)
 If I Remember (2012)
 Vintage Me (2014)
 Themes (2016)
 Classic (2017)

References

External links
  kennsmith.com Official Website
  GlobalBass.com bass interview in 2000
  allmusic

1962 births
Living people
American jazz guitarists
American rock guitarists
American jazz composers
People from Maywood, Illinois
20th-century American bass guitarists
Jazz musicians from Illinois
American male jazz composers
20th-century American male musicians